Martina Hingis and Anna Kournikova were the defending champions, but were forced to withdraw as Hingis suffered an ankle injury.

Lindsay Davenport and Lisa Raymond won the title by defeating Sandrine Testud and Roberta Vinci 6–3, 2–6, 6–2 in the final.

Seeds

Draw

Draw

External links
 Main and qualifying draws (WTA)

Zurich Open
Doubles